Kay Velda (born 23 June 1990) is a Dutch professional footballer who plays as a midfielder for SC Genemuiden. He formerly played for FC Emmen.

External links
 Voetbal International
 Kay Velda at Sport.de

1990 births
Living people
Dutch footballers
FC Emmen players
Eerste Divisie players
People from Hattem
Association football midfielders
SC Genemuiden players
Footballers from Gelderland